Oh, the Places You'll Go! is a book written and illustrated by children's author Dr. Seuss. It was first published by Random House on January 22, 1990. It was his last book to be published during his lifetime. The book concerns the journey of life, its challenges and joys.

Though written in the style of previous books such as Green Eggs and Ham and The Cat in the Hat, Oh, the Places You’ll Go!  has many specific characters, including a narrator and "the reader". A young boy, referred to simply as "you", initiates the action of the story; the presence of a main character helps readers to identify with the book. Unlike other Dr. Seuss books, it is written in the second person and uses the future tense.

Plot
The story begins with the narrator, relating the decision of the unnamed protagonist (who represents the reader) to leave town. The protagonist travels through several geometrical and polychromatic landscapes and places, eventually encountering a place simply called "The Waiting Place", which is ominously addressed as being a place where everyone is always waiting for something to happen. As the protagonist continues to explore, spurred on by the thoughts of places he will visit and things he will discover, the book cheerfully concludes with an open ending.

Reception
Following its original release in 1990, Oh, the Places You'll Go! reached number one on The New York Times Best-Selling Fiction Hardcover list. This made Dr. Seuss one of the handful of authors to have number one Hardcover Fiction and Nonfiction books on the list; among them are John Steinbeck, Jimmy Buffett, Mitch Albom and James Patterson; his You're Only Old Once! hit number one on the Nonfiction list in 1986.

In the United States and Canada, Oh, the Places You'll Go! is a popular gift for students graduating from kindergarten through college, spiking in sales in the April–June period. It reached number one on USA Todays Best Selling Book list in 1997, 2021 and 2022, and reached #2 in 2015 and 2017.  Based on a 2007 online poll, the National Education Association listed the book as one of its "Teachers' Top 100 Books for Children".

Film adaptation
In the early 1990s, producers Ben Myron & Roland Joffé, at Lightmotive with TriStar Pictures, were set to produce a film adaptation of the book with Seuss penning the screenplay. The Seuss screenplay was later rewritten by Richard LaGravenese and Barry Berman respectively, but the adaptation was never filmed. A musical animated film adaptation of the book along with The Cat in the Hat and a spin-off Thing One and Thing Two are in development from Warner Animation Group. J. J. Abrams is producing the film alongside his production company Bad Robot Productions. In November 2021, Jon M. Chu was attached to direct the film.

Legal issues
In 2016, former Star Trek writer David Gerrold partnered with artist Ty Templeton and Glenn Hauman's website ComicMix for a Kickstarter for a parodic book entitled Oh, the Places You'll Boldly Go! The proposed book would parody the original Seuss book in a Star Trek context. The title references the phrase "to boldly go where no one has gone before", made famous by Star Trek.

Dr. Seuss Enterprises, which manages the assets of Dr. Seuss's estate, sued to stop the Kickstarter. The lawsuit stated that Hauman's book, which, also makes use of other of Seuss' books, including Oh, The Places You'll Go!, Horton Hears a Who, How the Grinch Stole Christmas!, The Lorax, and The Sneetches and Other Stories, copied Dr. Seuss' copyrighted work, recreating entire pages from his books "with meticulous precision". The lawsuit also stated that the book's violation of Dr. Seuss' trademark would create confusion in the minds of the public as to Dr. Seuss's approval or licensing.

In May 2018, U.S District Court Judge Janis Sammartino found in favor of ComicMix on the issue of Dr. Seuss' trademark, ruling that its book was "a highly transformative work that takes no more than necessary to accomplish its transformative purpose and will not impinge on the original market for Plaintiff's underlying work".

In March 2019, Sammartino similarly found in favor of ComicMix on the issue of copyright, ruling that the book was protected under Fair Use, because its authors borrowed "no more than was necessary for their purposes" and those elements "were always adapted or transformed" and "imbued with a different character".

The Ninth Circuit Court of Appeals reversed that decision in December 2020 on the basis that the work was not parody as it copied too much of the book's original style and composition, only juxtaposing Star Trek characters in place of Seuss' original ones. Further, the Ninth Circuit argued that the timing of release might impact the commercial value of Seuss' book, since the latter is often given out as gifts for graduates.

References

American picture books
Books by Dr. Seuss
1990 children's books
Random House books